Tony Ramirez (born January 26, 1973) is a former offensive tackle in the National Football League and the XFL. He played three years for the NFL's Detroit Lions (1997–1999) and the XFL's Chicago Enforcers (2001).

External links
Chicago Enforcers profile

1973 births
Living people
Sportspeople from Lincoln, Nebraska
Players of American football from Nebraska
American football offensive tackles
Northern Colorado Bears football players
Detroit Lions players
Chicago Enforcers players